Pavel Löwy is a male former Czech international table tennis player.

Table tennis career
He won a bronze medal in the Swaythling Cup (men's team event) at the 1937 World Table Tennis Championships with Miloslav Hamr, Stanislav Kolář, Adolf Šlár, Bohumil Váňa.

Personal life
He was of Jewish origin and played for the Hagibor Prague club. He was sent to a concentration camp during the war and was possibly killed there. There is no record of further table tennis involvement after the war.

See also
 List of table tennis players
 List of World Table Tennis Championships medalists

References

Czech male table tennis players
Jewish table tennis players
Czech Jews
World Table Tennis Championships medalists